Cyperus redolens is a species of sedge that is native to tropical parts of South America.

See also 
 List of Cyperus species

References 

redolens
Plants described in 1890
Flora of Argentina
Flora of Brazil
Flora of Bolivia
Flora of Paraguay
Flora of Peru
Flora of Uruguay
Flora of Venezuela